Giovanna Fletcher (née Falcone, born 29 January 1985) is an English blogger, podcaster, author, actress, and presenter. Since 2019, she has presented the CBeebies series The Baby Club. She won series 20 of I'm a Celebrity...Get Me Out of Here!.

Early life 
Falcone was born in Essex on 29 January 1985 to an Italian father, Mario, and English mother, Kim Falcone. She has two siblings: Giorgina and Mario Falcone. She attended the performing arts school Sylvia Young Theatre School in London, followed by the Rose Bruford College of Theatre and Performance.

Career

Theatre

In December 2016, Fletcher had her professional concert debut, singing on stage in London's West End in Alan Menken's A Christmas Carol at the Lyceum Theatre. In December 2017, she performed in the musical production of her husband's novel The Christmasaurus alongside Tom, Carrie Hope Fletcher, Harry Judd and Matt Willis. In 2021, it was announced that Fletcher would be playing Jenny in the stage play 2:22: A Ghost Story.

Television and film work 
Fletcher’s on-screen roles include an uncredited role in The Boat That Rocked, as a guest on Loose Women, as a contestant on All Star Mr & Mrs, and most recently as the presenter of The Baby Club on CBeebies. She has had appearances on ITV's morning TV show Lorraine since 2015, including presenting a segment for the show called Take 5. She participated in series 20 of I'm a Celebrity...Get Me Out of Here!. She was announced winner of the series on 4 December 2020.

Writing 
Fletcher's writing career started with an unpublished satirical project entitled Dating McFly is for Dummies. Prior to becoming an author, Fletcher wrote for several magazines, including work experience at Heat, where she wrote book reviews and copy for their website, and an internship at Bliss magazine. Fletcher also worked at Recognise Magazine She also has a regular blog feature on Hello! magazine's website.

Through her blogging and book reviewing work, Fletcher networked with authors and literary folk at book events. It was in one of these events that she spoke to novelist Dorothy Koomson, and it was this pivotal conversation that inspired Fletcher to write a book of her own. Fletcher's debut novel, Billy and Me, was published in May 2013, followed by You're the One That I Want in May 2014. Dream a Little Dream was published in June 2015, and a fourth novel, Always with Love followed in June 2016. In 2017, she published her first non-fiction book, Happy Mum, Happy Baby: My Adventures in Motherhood, and later that same year, released her fifth novel, Some Kind of Wonderful.

Music 
Fletcher has sung in musical performances on several YouTube videos, posted to her husband, Tom's, YouTube channel. She has performed duet covers in a series called "Me & Mrs F", covering songs including "How Do You Like Your Eggs In the Morning?", "It Ain't Me Babe", "L-O-V-E", "You Really Got a Hold on Me", "Moon River", "Love Is on the Radio", and "Tonight You Belong to Me". Most of these covers have over half a million views each, with "Love Is on the Radio" having accumulated 1.8 million views over 3 years.

Podcasts

Fletcher is the host of parenting podcast Happy Mum, Happy Baby. The podcast gained national attention when Kate Middleton appeared to discuss her own experiences with motherhood. Fletcher also took the podcast on tour in 2019 with guests such as Helen Flanagan, Gemma Atkinson, Bryony Gordon, Jamelia, Ore & Portia Oduba, Kaytee Jones and Christine McGuinness.

In 2021, Fletcher began hosting  a six-part series Journey to the Magic..., an official Walt Disney Travel Company podcast.

Personal life 
On 18 April 2011, Fletcher was engaged to  Tom Fletcher from McFly. They were married on 12 May 2012. It was announced on his YouTube channel on 29 October 2013 that the couple were expecting their first child, with a video titled We Have Some News.... On 13 March 2014, their son Buzz Michelangelo Fletcher was born. On 16 February 2016, their second son Buddy Bob Fletcher was born. On 3 March 2018, they announced that they were expecting a third child; On 24 August 2018, they welcomed their third son, named Max Mario Fletcher.

Bibliography 
Fletcher, Giovanna (2013). Billy and Me. (Billy and Me Series Book #1) London: Penguin. 
Fletcher, Giovanna (2014). You're the One That I Want. London: Penguin. 
Fletcher, Giovanna (2014). Christmas With Billy and Me. (Billy and Me Series Book #1.5) London: Penguin. 
Fletcher, Giovanna (2015). Dream a Little Dream (Dream a Little Dream Series Book #1). London: Penguin. 
Fletcher, Giovanna (2015). Dream a Little Christmas Dream (Dream a Little Dream Series Book #1.5). London: Penguin. 
Fletcher, Giovanna (2016). Always With Love. (Billy and Me Series Book #2) London: Penguin. 
Fletcher, Giovanna (2017). Happy Mum, Happy Baby: My Adventures in Motherhood. London: Coronet. 
Fletcher, Giovanna (2017). Some Kind of Wonderful. London: Penguin. 
Fletcher, Giovanna and Tom (2018). Eve of Man (Book 1). London: Penguin. 
Fletcher, Giovanna and Tom (2019). Eve of Man (Book 2). London: Penguin. 
Fletcher, Giovanna. (2020). Letters on Motherhood. London: Penguin. 
Fletcher, Giovanna (2021). Walking on Sunshine

References

External links
 
 

Living people
1985 births
21st-century English novelists
Actresses from Essex
British actors of Latin American descent
English bloggers
English television presenters
English YouTubers
English people of Argentine descent
English people of Italian descent
I'm a Celebrity...Get Me Out of Here! (British TV series) winners